Aksel Duun (26 March 1921 – 3 April 1987) was a Danish sprint canoer who competed in the late 1950s. At the 1956 Summer Olympics in Melbourne, he finished sixth in the C-2 10000 m event.

References

Sports-reference.com profile

1921 births
1987 deaths
Canoeists at the 1956 Summer Olympics
Danish male canoeists
Olympic canoeists of Denmark